Hafnium disulfide is an inorganic compound of hafnium and sulfur. It is a layered dichalcogenide with the chemical formula is HfS2. A few atomic layers of this material can be exfoliated using the standard Scotch Tape technique (see graphene) and used for the fabrication of a field-effect transistor. High-yield synthesis of HfS2 has also been demonstrated using liquid phase exfoliation, resulting in the production of stable few-layer HfS2 flakes. Hafnium disulfide powder can be produced by reacting hydrogen sulfide and hafnium oxides at 500–1300 °C.

References 

Hafnium compounds
Sulfides
Transition metal dichalcogenides
Monolayers